Speed of thought may refer to:

Nerve conduction velocity
The Speed of Thought, a 2011 thriller film